The 2013 UC Davis football team represented the University of California, Davis as a member of the Big Sky Conference during the 2013 NCAA Division I FCS football season. Led by first-year head coach Ron Gould, UC Davis compiled an overall record of 5–7 with a mark of 5–3 in conference play, placing in four-way tie for fourth in the Big Sky. The Aggies played home games at Aggie Stadium in Davis, California.

Schedule
UC Davis played 10 Big Sky opponents during the 2013 season, but only eight of the games counted as conference games. Games against Portland State and Northern Arizona counted as non-conference games and had no effect on the Big Sky standings.

Media
All UC Davis games were carried live on KHTK 1140 AM. All home games and conference road games not being shown as part of the Root Sports game of the week package were carried through the conferences online streaming service Big Sky TV.

References

UC Davis
UC Davis Aggies football seasons
UC Davis Aggies football